Complicity is a legal term describing participation in a completed criminal act by an accomplice.

The term may also be used to refer to:
 Complicity (novel), a 1993 novel by Iain Banks
 Complicity (film), a 2000 film based on the novel 
 Complicit (film), a 2013 British television film
 Complicit (play), a 2009 play by Joe Sutton